Baise Bichawa  was a village development committee in Kanchanpur District in  Sudurpashchim Province of south-western Nepal. At the time of the 1991 Nepal census it had a population of 7678 people living in 1142 individual households.

It was merged to the rural municipality in 2017.

References

Populated places in Kanchanpur District